Nikita Leonidovich Vorona (born 8 July 1995) is a Russian football player.

Club career
He made his debut in the Russian Second Division for FC Akademiya Tolyatti on 24 August 2012 in a game against FC Volga Ulyanovsk.

References

External links
 
 
 Career summary by sportbox.ru

1995 births
Living people
Russian footballers
Association football midfielders
FC Academia Chișinău players
Russian expatriate footballers
Expatriate footballers in Moldova
FC Dynamo Barnaul players
FC Rubin Kazan players
FC Kuban Krasnodar players
Moldovan Super Liga players